The Cornwall County Football Association, also known as the Cornwall FA, is the governing body of football in Cornwall. Formed in 1889, it is responsible for the administration, control, promotion and development of football at all levels throughout the county.

Organisation
The Cornwall County Football Association was formed on 18 September 1889, at a meeting held at the Royal Hotel in Truro. Representatives from Dunheved College (Launceston), Liskeard, Millbrook, Penzance, Porthcurnow, Probus, Torpoint and Truro were involved in the meeting. The CCFA relocated to its present headquarters at Kernow House, Bodmin, in December 2009. Almost 400 clubs are affiliated with the association today, with approximately 500 teams playing 11-a-side football in Cornwall, making it the most popular sport in the county.

There are a further 300 teams playing youth football, and 250 playing small-sides football, as the association aims to encourage people of all ages, genders, and abilities to be involved in the game. The association's most prestigious tournament, the Cornwall Senior Cup, was first played at Liskeard on 3 April 1893, where Penzance defeated Launceston 5–0. In addition to the Senior Cup, the CCFA organises the Junior Cup, the Sunday Cup, the Women's Cup, the Durning Lawrence Charity Cup, the Under-18 PM Bartlett Trophy League, the Under-18 Rathbone Trophy, the Under-16 Luke Cup, and the Under-16 Girls' League.

There are 31 leagues that are affiliated with the CCFA, that cover 11-a-side, six and five-a-side, men's, women's, and youngsters from under-9 to under-18 years of age. There are three representative teams who compete at county level, the women's, youth, and girls' under-16s. The county's colours are gold and black.

Representative team
The men's representative team has represented Cornwall against international, as well as other county sides. Cornwall played three friendly matches against Trinidad & Tobago who toured England in 1953, and have competed against Guernsey and Jersey on a regular basis since 1998.  The county is affiliated with the FA, and therefore cannot compete at full international level, such as the FIFA World Cup, and the UEFA European Football Championship.

Affiliated Leagues

Men's Saturday Leagues
South West Peninsula League**
Cornwall Combination League**
Duchy League**
East Cornwall League**
Trelawny League**

Footnote: **Part of the English football league system.

Womens and Girls Leagues
Cornwall Women's Football League
Cornwall Girls League*

Footnote: **Part of the English football league system.

Men's Sunday Leagues
Cornwall Sunday League
West Cornwall Sunday League

Youth Leagues
Kernow Youth League 
East Cornwall Youth League

Other Leagues
Cornwall disAbility Football League
Cornwall Veterans League

Small Sided Leagues
Carn Brea 5 a side League 
Cornwall 6 a side – St Austell
Penryn Football Development Centre – 5-a-side league
Soccer Nights – adult men's leagues in the Truro, Camborne, Penzance & Bodmin areas

Futsal Leagues
Futsal League – Cornwall College Camborne
Futsal League – St Austell's Polkyth Leisure Centre
Futsal League – Torpoint & Rame Community Sports Centre

Source:

Disbanded or Amalgamated Leagues

A number of leagues that were affiliated to the Cornwall County FA have disbanded or amalgamated with other leagues including:

Bodmin and District League
Falmouth & Helston League and the Mining Division League (amalgamated in 2011 to become the Trelawny League)''
Launceston and District League
Liskeard and District League and St Austell and District League (amalgamated to become Duchy League)
West Penwith League
Amor Shield

Affiliated Member Clubs
Members of the Cornwall County Football Association include;

 Biscovey
 Bodmin Town
 Bude Town
 Callington Town
 Camelford
 Dobwalls
 Edgcumbe
 Falmouth Town
 Foxhole Stars
 Godolphin Atlantic
 Hayle
 Helston Athletic
 Holmans Sports Club
 Illogan RBL
 Lanreath
 Launceston
 Liskeard Athletic
 Ludgvan
 Millbrook
 Morwenstow
 Mousehole
 Mullion
 Nanpean Rovers
 Newquay
 Penryn Athletic
 Penzance
 Perranporth
 Perranwell
 Polperro
 Porthleven
 Portreath
 Probus
 RNAS Culdrose
 Roche
 Saltash United
 Sticker
 St Agnes
 St Austell
 St Blazey
 St Columb Major
 St Day
 St Dennis
 St Dominick
 St Ives Town
 St Just
 St Stephen
 St Stephens Borough
 Torpoint Athletic
 Troon
 Truro City
 Wadebridge Town
 Wendron United

Competitions

Cups

Leagues

Footnotes

References

External links

 Official organizational website of the Cornwall FA

County football associations
 
Football
Sports organizations established in 1889